Postel Nunatak is a nunatak, 1,450 m, standing 8 nautical miles (15 km) southwest of Snake Ridge along the ice escarpment that trends southwest from the ridge, in the Patuxent Range, Pensacola Mountains. Mapped by United States Geological Survey (USGS) from surveys and U.S. Navy air photos, 1956–66. Named by Advisory Committee on Antarctic Names (US-ACAN) for Philip A. Postel, meteorologist at South Pole Station, winter 1967.

Nunataks of Queen Elizabeth Land